Nejlepší ženská mého života is a 1968 Czechoslovak comedy film directed by Martin Frič as his final film.

Cast
 Jiří Sovák as Láda
 Milena Dvorská as Kaplanová
 Jarmila Smejkalová as Jirina
 Iva Janžurová as Blanka
 Ivanka Devátá as Marta
 Čestmír Řanda as Kaderábek
 Vladimír Hlavatý as Koula
 Nina Popelíková as Zouharová
 Věra Tichánková as Honzíková

References

External links
 

1968 films
1968 comedy films
1960s Czech-language films
Czechoslovak black-and-white films
Films directed by Martin Frič
Czech comedy films
1960s Czech films